Shūgo, Shugo or Shuugo (written: , ,  or  in katakana) is a masculine Japanese given name. Notable people with the name include:

, Japanese voice actor and singer
, Japanese footballer
, Japanese actor
, Japanese singer-songwriter
, Japanese footballer

Shūgō or Shuugou is a separate given name, though it may be romanized the same way. Notable people with the name include:

, Japanese footballer

Japanese masculine given names